Free for All may refer to: 

 Free for All (film), a 1949 American comedy film
 "Free for All" (The Prisoner), a 1967 episode of the British television series The Prisoner
 Free-for-All (Ted Nugent album), a 1976 album by Ted Nugent
 "Free-for-All", the album's title track
 Free-for-All (Michael Penn album) a 1989 album
 Free for All (TV series), a US American animated series created by Brett Merhar
 Free For All link page, a search engine optimization technique
 Deathmatch (gaming), a video game mode, sometimes referred to as "free for all"
 Free for All (album), a 1964 Blue Note album by Art Blakey & the Jazz Messengers
 "Freeforall", a 1986 short story by Margaret Atwood